Two vessels named Torride have served the French Navy between 1786 and 1815:

 Torride was the merchant tartane Union that the French Navy acquired in 1794 and renamed Torride in May 1795. She was a chaloupe-canonnière (gun-shallop), that the French Navy used as an aviso. The Navy may have sold her in 1797 to the Bey of Tunis.
  was the cutter Sally of unknown origin that the French Navy converted into a gun-vessel. The British Royal Navy captured her in 1798 at Abu Qir and she served as HMS Torride at the Siege of Acre. She is last listed in 1802.

Notes

References
 

French Navy ship names